942 Romilda (prov. designation:  or ) is a background asteroid, approximately  in diameter, located in the outer region of the asteroid belt. It was discovered by German astronomer Karl Reinmuth at the Heidelberg Observatory on 11 October 1920. The assumed C-type asteroid has a rotation period of 6.97 hours. It was named "Romilda", a common German female name unrelated to the discoverer's contemporaries, that was taken from the almanac Lahrer Hinkender Bote.

Orbit and classification 

Romilda is a non-family asteroid of the main belt's background population when applying the hierarchical clustering method to its proper orbital elements. It orbits the Sun in the outer asteroid belt at a distance of 2.6–3.7 AU once every 5 years and 8 months (2,057 days; semi-major axis of 3.17 AU). Its orbit has an eccentricity of 0.17 and an inclination of 11° with respect to the ecliptic.

Discovery 

On 11 October 1920, Romilda was discovered by Karl Reinmuth at the Heidelberg-Königstuhl State Observatory in southwest Germany. On the same night, German astronomer Arnold Schwassmann independently discovered the asteroid at the Bergedorf Observatory in Hamburg. However, the Minor Planet Center only credits Reinmuth as official discoverer. The body's observation arc begins at Heidelberg Observatory on 21 October 1920, the night after its official discovery observation.

Naming 

This minor planet was named "Romilda", after a female name picked from the Lahrer Hinkender Bote, published in Lahr, southern Germany. A Hinkender Bote (lit. "limping messenger") was a very popular almanac, especially in the alemannic-speaking region from the late 17th throughout the early 20th century. The calendar section contains feast and name days, the dates of important fairs and astronomical ephemerides. For 25 March, the calendar gives "Romilda" as the German analogue next to the catholic and protestant feast days (The Annunciation to the Blessed Virgin Mary).

Reinmuth's calendar names 

As with 22 other asteroids – starting with 913 Otila, and ending with 1144 Oda – Reinmuth selected names from this calendar due to his many asteroid discoveries that he had trouble thinking of proper names. These names are not related to the discoverer's contemporaries. Lutz Schmadel, the author of the Dictionary of Minor Planet Names learned about Reinmuth's source of inspiration from private communications with Dutch astronomer Ingrid van Houten-Groeneveld, who worked as a young astronomer at Heidelberg.

Physical characteristics 

Romilda is an assumed carbonaceous C-type asteroid.

Rotation period 

In December 2005, a rotational lightcurve of Romilda was obtained from photometric observations over seven nights by Walter Cooney at the Blackberry Observatory  in Louisiana. Lightcurve analysis gave a rotation period of  hours with a brightness variation of  magnitude. In January 2006, Italian astronomers Roberto Crippa and Federico Manzini at the Sozzago Astronomical Station  determined a nearly identical period of  hours with an amplitude of  magnitude.

Diameter and albedo 

The Collaborative Asteroid Lightcurve Link assumes a standard albedo for a carbonaceous asteroid of 0.057 and calculates a diameter of 35.12 km based on an absolute magnitude of 11.

References

External links 
 Lightcurve Database Query (LCDB), at www.minorplanet.info
 Dictionary of Minor Planet Names, Google books
 Asteroids and comets rotation curves, CdR – Geneva Observatory, Raoul Behrend
 Discovery Circumstances: Numbered Minor Planets (1)-(5000) – Minor Planet Center
 
 

000942
Discoveries by Karl Wilhelm Reinmuth
Named minor planets
19201011